William Raymond Clark (born 19 May 1967) is a former professional footballer and a current youth team coach with Bath City. He has two children called Bonney and Bailey Clark.

Clark was born in Christchurch, Hampshire on the south coast of England and began his footballing career as a trainee with AFC Bournemouth. Most of his career was spent with Bristol Rovers, where he spent ten years and made 289 appearances for the club in all competitions, scoring fifteen goals.

Recently, Clark rejoined Weston-super-Mare for his second stint with the club. He captained The Seagulls from 2003-2005 before moving to rivals Clevedon Town. His role with Weston was a coach/player which he played defense as well as being used in a coaching capacity.

Clark has since retired from professional football with Weston-super-Mare retaining his rights. He was a youth coach with Bristol Rovers before moving on to perform the same role with Bath City FC in 2009.

External links

References

1967 births
Living people
People from Christchurch, Dorset
Footballers from Dorset
English footballers
Association football defenders
English Football League players
National League (English football) players
AFC Bournemouth players
Bristol Rovers F.C. players
Bath City F.C. players
Cheltenham Town F.C. players
Exeter City F.C. players
Forest Green Rovers F.C. players
Newport County A.F.C. players
Weston-super-Mare A.F.C. players
Clevedon Town F.C. players